Bror Joel Hellström (26 November 1914 – 3 August 1992) was a Swedish runner. He competed at the 1936 Summer Olympics in the 5000 m event and finished 14th. In 1941 he won the national title and set a national record over this distance.

References

1914 births
1992 deaths
Swedish male long-distance runners
Swedish male middle-distance runners
Olympic athletes of Sweden
Athletes (track and field) at the 1936 Summer Olympics
Athletes from Stockholm
20th-century Swedish people